Edward George Bollard  (21 January 1920 – 10 November 2011) was a New Zealand plant physiologist and science administrator.

Biography
Born in Athlone, Ireland in 1920, Bollard moved to New Zealand as a child with his family. He was dux at Mt Albert Grammar School and then attended Auckland University College (now the University of Auckland). He joined Plant Diseases Division of the Department of Scientific and Industrial Research (DSIR), but all territorial units were called up after the bombing of Pearl Harbour and he left with the 9th Reinforcements of the 2nd New Zealand Expeditionary Force. He was involved in the invasion of Italy. Despite being a Pākehā, he was assigned to the Māori Battalion as a signaller.

At the end of the war he received a bursary to attend Emmanuel College, Cambridge and do a PhD under F. T. Brooks.

Returning to New Zealand he rejoined the DSIR and rose to direct its plant diseases division. He was elected a Fellow of the Royal Society of New Zealand in 1964, and was award the Hector Medal in 1972. In 1977, he was awarded the Queen Elizabeth II Silver Jubilee Medal, and in the 1983 New Year Honours, he was appointed a Commander of the Order of the British Empire, for services to science.

Bollard died in Auckland in 2011 and his ashes were interred at Purewa Cemetery in 2013.

References

External links
 google scholar

1920 births
2011 deaths
People from Athlone
Irish emigrants to New Zealand
University of Auckland alumni
New Zealand military personnel of World War II
Alumni of Emmanuel College, Cambridge
20th-century New Zealand botanists
People associated with Department of Scientific and Industrial Research (New Zealand)
New Zealand Commanders of the Order of the British Empire
Burials at Purewa Cemetery
Presidents of the Royal Society of New Zealand